EAFB can refer to:
Edwards Air Force Base
Joint Base Elmendorf-Richardson
Ellsworth Air Force Base
Elmendorf Field